The Alva School (also known as the Alva Elementary and Middle School) is a historic school in Alva, Florida. It is located at 21291 North River Road. On June 10, 1999, it was added to the U.S. National Register of Historic Places.

This property is part of the Lee County Multiple Property Submission, a Multiple Property Submission to the National Register.

References

External links

 Lee County listings at National Register of Historic Places
 Florida's Office of Cultural and Historical Programs
 Lee County listings
 Alva Elementary School
 Alva Elementary School - official site
 Alva Middle School - official site

National Register of Historic Places in Lee County, Florida
Schools in Lee County, Florida
Public elementary schools in Florida
Public middle schools in Florida
Vernacular architecture in Florida
1914 establishments in Florida
Educational institutions established in 1914